Liverpool is a borough located in the northeastern corner of Perry County, Pennsylvania, United States. It is part of the Harrisburg–Carlisle metropolitan statistical area. 

The borough's population was nine hundred and fifty-nine at the time of the 2020 census.

Location
Liverpool is located along the Susquehanna River and U.S. Routes 11 and 15 at the eastern terminus of Pennsylvania Route 17.

It is not to be confused with Liverpool Township, which is adjacent to the borough.

History
Liverpool was settled in 1808 by the Stailey family, who emigrated from Liverpool, England, for which it was named. Located beside the Susquehanna River in eastern Perry County, the community was surveyed by John Huggins and plotted by Peter Williamson that year, and originally was made up of the land located between present-day North Alley to Strawberry Street. Subsequently incorporated on May 4, 1832, it is one of the nine boroughs that have been incorporated in the county. The neighboring community of Northern Liberties was absorbed into Liverpool at the time of its incorporation.

As the population grew, so did its business offerings, civic services and industries. Its first businessmen were merchant Thomas Gallagher and hotelier John Huggins.

In subsequent months and years, a foundry was built, George Thorp opened a distillery, and John Speece erected a tannery operation.

The community's first schoolhouse was a twenty-five-square-foot log structure.

In July 1821, John Huggins launched the borough's first newspaper, the Mercury, which was absorbed later that decade by The Perry County Democrat.

Over the years, a bank, post office and multiple new businesses and churches were also built.

By 1829, the Pennsylvania Canal system had completed work on its Main Line Canal, which ran north, parallel to the Susquehanna River for thirty-nine miles, from Duncan's Island in Perry County (now Duncannon) through New Buffalo, Girty's Notch, Montgomery's Ferry, Mount Patrick, Liverpool, and Selinsgrove to Northumberland. Liverpool ultimately became the Mainline Canal's hub, attracting canal boat builders and operators, more hotels to house visitors to the area and more homes for the employees of the businesses that catered to those travelers.

In 1910, the population of the borough was five hundred and ninety-six. By 1912, the borough's schools employed four teachers.

School district

Liverpool is part of the Greenwood School District, the campus of which is located in nearby Millerstown.

Emergency services
Liverpool's fire and emergency medical services are provided by the Liverpool Volunteer Fire Company.

Demographics
According to the 2010 Census, Liverpool was home to nine hundred and fifty-five people at the time. 

The population consisted of 47.2% males and 52.8% females. 96.1% of residents were White, 1% were Asian, 0.6% were Hispanic, 0.5% were Black, 0.2% were Native Americans/Pacific Islanders, and 0.2% were of other races or two or more races.

In 2010, the median household income was $35,517.

References

Pennsylvania populated places on the Susquehanna River
Populated places established in 1808
Harrisburg–Carlisle metropolitan statistical area
Boroughs in Perry County, Pennsylvania
1832 establishments in Pennsylvania